Neospathodus is an extinct genus of conodonts.

Use in stratigraphy 
The base of the Olenekian stage of the Early Triassic is at the lowest occurrence of Neospathodus waageni. It is defined as ending near the lowest occurrences of Chiosella timorensis.

The GSSP Candidate sections are in the Mud (Muth) village in the Spiti valley, India or in Chaohu, China.

References 

 Taxonomy and correlation of Lower Triassic (Spathian) segminate conodonts from Oman and revision of some species of Neospathodus. M. J. Orchard, Journal of Paleontology, Volume 69, Issue 01, January 1995, pages 110–122,

External links 
 
 

Ozarkodinida genera
Triassic conodonts
Permian India